The FDA, formerly The Association of First Division Civil Servants, is a trade union for UK senior and middle management civil servants and public service professionals founded in 1919.

Its over 18,000 members include Whitehall policy advisers, middle and senior managers, tax inspectors, economists and statisticians, government-employed lawyers, crown prosecutors, procurators fiscal, schools inspectors, diplomats, senior national museum staff, senior civil servants, accountants and National Health Service (NHS) managers.

Membership structure and affiliations
Its federal structure means that some sections of the union operate under separate branding.  Three parts of the union have distinctive institutional features. Senior staff at HM Revenue and Customs join the Association of Revenue and Customs (ARC) which is also a certified trade union as well as a section of FDA. Managers in the NHS join Managers in Partnership (MiP), a joint venture with Unison of which MiP members are also members.
Members in middle management (Higher Executive Officer and Senior Executive Officers) join Keystone.

The FDA is an affiliate of the Trades Union Congress, the Scottish Trades Union Congress, the Wales TUC and the Irish Congress of Trade Unions but is not affiliated to the Labour Party or any other political party. The FDA is also affiliated to Public Services International.

Name 
Despite often being known, particularly in the British press, as the "First Division Association", the legal name is "FDA". It describes itself as "FDA - the union of choice for senior managers and professionals in public service".

The original name, Association of First Division Civil Servants, was chosen because it represented first division clerks, as opposed to the Second Division Association, which represented more junior clerks. Although the terms first and second division clerks were abolished in the 1920s, it proved impossible to agree on an alternative name, and the name remained until 2000 when, following a motion to the union's annual delegate conference, the official name became "FDA".

General Secretary 
Dave Penman, formerly Deputy General Secretary, was elected unopposed as General Secretary in May 2012  and took up office from July 2012.

His immediate predecessors were Jonathan Baume (1997-2012) (who had previously been Assistant General Secretary and Deputy General Secretary),
Elizabeth Symons (1989–96) and John Ward (1980–88). The first full-time General Secretary was Norman Ellis, appointed in 1974.

In 1996, the then Labour Party leader Tony Blair was criticised after he nominated the outgoing FDA General Secretary Liz Symons for a peerage.

See also

British Civil Service

Notes

External links
FDA website

Trade unions in the United Kingdom
1918 establishments in the United Kingdom
Public Services International
Trade unions established in 1918
Civil service trade unions
Trade unions based in London
Trade unions affiliated with the Trades Union Congress